John Pluthero (born 1964) is a British businessman.

Born in Chelmsford, Essex, in 1964, Pluthero was educated at Colchester Royal Grammar School and London School of Economics and joined the accounting firm Coopers and Lybrand after graduating. He later worked for P&O and served as director of the Chelsea Harbour development.

His held senior positions at Dixons, Freeserve and Energis (including as CEO of Energis) in the 1990s and early 2000s.

On 28 June 2011 the board of Cable & Wireless Worldwide announced that Pluthero would replace Jim Marsh as CEO. He left the role in November 2011, less than six months after taking the job, after the company suffered substantial losses.

Pluthero is a member of the Institute of Chartered Accountants in England & Wales.

References

Living people
1964 births
People educated at Colchester Royal Grammar School